Entre Tangos Y Mariachi (Between Tangos And Mariachi) is the title of a studio album released by Spanish performer Rocío Dúrcal on 15 May 2001 by BMG Ariola. This was the second album produced by Argentinian songwriter Bebu Silvetti for the singer.

This album features ten cover versions of famous tango, mariachi and samba songs that cross the genres of the mariachi and tango musical styles.  To promote this album, the Spanish singer embarked on a tour, performing concert dates in Spain.  This ended 13 years of absence from her native land.

Four singles were released from Entre Tangos Y Mariachi. Its lead single ("Sombras... Nada Más") became a hit all over Latin America and in the United States, where it peaked at number 9 on the Billboard Latin Pop Airplay and at number 16 on the Hot Latin Tracks.

Track listing

Charts 
 Billboard Singles

 Billboard Albums

Certifications

Credits and personnel 
Musicians
 Rocío Dúrcal – (Vocals)
 Manny Lopez - (electric and acoustic guitars)
 Juan Carlos Navarro, Alfredo Solis – (Mariachi and Guitars)
 Guadalupe Alfaro – (Vihuela)
 Miami Symphony Orchestra – (Strings)
 Jeanne Tarrant – (Flute)
 Robert Weiner – (Oboe)
 Alfredo Oliva – (Accordion)
 Levi Mora-Arriaga – (Trumpet)
 Bebu Silvetti – (Piano and Synthesizer)
 Julio Hernandez – (Bass)
 Orlando Hernandez – (Drums)

Production
 Direction and production: Bebu Silvetti.
 Executive Director: Adrian Posse and Antonio Morales.
 Address A & R (artists and repertoire): Alejandro Barrales.
 Engineer: Alfredo Matheus.
 Digital management engineer Boris Milan.
 Coordination: Sylvia Silvetti.
 Arranger: Bebu Silvetti.
 Recorded at: The Gallery, Miami, Florida, United States.
 Photographer: Adolfo Pérez Butron.
 Label: BMG Music and Ariola Records (CD), RCA Records (Cassette).
 Manufactured and Distributed by BMG Music, Ariola International and RCA International.

References

Rocío Dúrcal albums
Mariachi albums
2001 albums
Albums produced by Bebu Silvetti